Hibernia College  is a third-level private college in Ireland. Its main entity, the Hibernia College School of Education, provides an initial teacher training programme, and other professional teaching courses.

Education
Hibernia College’s programmes in teacher education are accredited by the Teaching Council of Ireland and awarded by the national qualification authority, Quality and Qualifications Ireland. Master’s programmes are 120 credit awards at level 9, delivered over the course of 24 months.

Research
The School of Education pursues research as a core strategy to improve evidence-based practice in education and training. The college has partnered with other entities including Harvard University, Economic and Social Research Institute, Law Society of Ireland, National Forum for the Advancement of Teaching and Learning in Higher Education, Standing Conference on Teacher Education North and South, University College Dublin, Marino Institute of Education, Stranmilllis University and Trinity College Dublin.

References

Education in Dublin (city)
Educational institutions established in 2000
Universities and colleges in the Republic of Ireland
2000 establishments in Ireland